The 21st District of the Iowa House of Representatives in the state of Iowa.

Current elected officials
Tom Moore is the representative currently representing the district.

Past representatives
The district has previously been represented by:
 Donald V. Doyle, 1971–1973
 Richard Norpel, 1973–1975
 Thomas J. Gilloon, 1975–1979
 Joseph J. Welsh, 1979–1983
 Robert H. Renken, 1983–1997
 Bill Dix, 1997–2003
 Donald L. Shoultz, 2003–2007
 Tami Wiencek, 2007–2009
 Kerry Burt, 2009–2011
 Anesa Kajtazović, 2011–2013
 Jack Drake, 2013–2015
 Tom Moore, 2015–present

References

021